The second Berlusconi government was the 57th government of the Italian Republic and the first government of the XIV Legislature. It took office following the 2001 elections, and held office from 11 June 2001 until 23 April 2005, a total of 1,412 days, or 3 years, 10 months and 12 days. It held office for the longest period in the history of the Republic, and for the second longest period in the history of unified Italy since 1861 (outlasted only by the Mussolini government). During its long tenure, its composition changed significantly. Following the poor performance of the centrist parties in the Italian regional elections of 2005, most of the ministers of the Union of Christian and Centre Democrats and the New PSI resigned from the government, which was succeeded by the third Berlusconi government.

Formation
In 2001 Berlusconi again ran as leader of the centre-right coalition House of Freedoms, which included the Union of Christian and Centre Democrats, the Northern League, the National Alliance and other minor parties. Berlusconi's success in the May 2001 general election led to him becoming Prime Minister once more, with the coalition receiving 45.4% of the vote for the Chamber of Deputies and 42.5% for the Senate.

On the television interviews programme Porta a Porta, during the last days of the electoral campaign, Berlusconi created a powerful impression on the public by undertaking to sign a so-called Contratto con gli Italiani, an idea copied outright by his advisor Luigi Crespi from the Newt Gingrich's Contract with America introduced six weeks before the 1994 US Congressional election, which was widely considered to be a creative masterstroke in his 2001 campaign bid for prime ministership. In this solemn agreement, Berlusconi claimed his commitment on improving several aspects of the Italian economy and life. Firstly, he undertook to simplify the complex tax system by introducing just two tax rates (33% for those earning over 100,000 euros, and 23% for anyone earning less than that figure: anyone earning less than 11,000 euros a year would not be taxed); secondly, he promised to halve the unemployment rate; thirdly, he undertook to finance and develop a massive new public works programme. Fourthly, he promised to raise the minimum monthly pension rate to 516 euros; and fifthly, he would suppress the crime wave by introducing police officers to patrol all local zones and areas in Italy's major cities. Berlusconi undertook to refrain from putting himself up for re-election in 2006 if he failed to honour at least four of these five promises.

The government obtained the confidence of the senate on 20 June 2001 with 175 votes in favour, 133 against and 5 abstentions, and the confidence of the Chamber of Deputies on 21 June 2001 with 351 votes in favour, 261 against and 1 abstention.

The opposition parties claim Berlusconi was not able to achieve the goals he promised in his Contratto con gli Italiani. Some of his partners in government, especially the National Alliance and the Union of Christian and Centre Democrats have admitted the Government fell short of the promises made in the agreement, attributing the failure to an unforeseeable downturn in global economic conditions. Berlusconi himself has consistently asserted that he achieved all the goals of the agreement, and said his Government provided un miracolo continuo (a continuous miracle) that made all 'earlier governments pale' (by comparison). He attributed the widespread failure to recognize these achievements to a campaign of mystification and vilification in the printed media, asserting that 85% of newspapers were opposed to him. Luca Ricolfi, an independent analyst, held that Berlusconi had managed to maintain only one promise out of five, the one concerning minimum pension levels. The other four promises were not, in Luca Ricolfi’s view, honoured. In particular, the undertakings on the tax simplification and the reduction of crime.

Fall
The House of Freedoms did not do as well in the 2003 local elections as it did in the 2001 national elections. In common with many other European governing groups, in the 2004 elections of the European Parliament, gaining 43.37% support. Forza Italia's support was also reduced from 29.5% to 21.0% (in the 1999 European elections Forza Italia had 25.2%). As an outcome of these results the other coalition parties, whose electoral results were more satisfactory, asked Berlusconi and Forza Italia for greater influence in the government's political line.

In the 2005 regional elections (3 April/4 April 2005), the centre-left gubernatorial candidates won in 12 out of 14 regions where control of local governments and governorships was at stake. Berlusconi's coalition kept only two of the regional bodies (Lombardy and Veneto) up for re-election. Three parties, Union of Christian and Centre Democrats, National Alliance and New PSI, threatened to withdraw from the Berlusconi government. The Italian Premier, after some hesitation, then presented to the President of the Republic a request for the dissolution of his government on 20 April 2005.

Party breakdown

Beginning of term

Ministers

Ministers and other members
 Forza Italia (FI): Prime minister, 12 ministers, 29 undersecretaries
 National Alliance (AN): Deputy Prime minister, 4 ministers, 14 undersecretaries
 Northern League (LN): 3 ministers, 6 undersecretaries
 Christian Democratic Centre (CCD): 1 minister, 4 undersecretaries
 United Christian Democrats (CDU): 1 minister, 2 undersecretaries
 Independents: 2 ministers, 2 undersecretaries
 New Italian Socialist Party (NPSI): 1 undersecretary
 Italian Republican Party (PRI): 1 undersecretary

End of term

Ministers

Ministers and other members
 Forza Italia (FI): Prime minister, 10 ministers, 3 deputy ministers, 31 undersecretaries
 National Alliance (AN): 5 ministers (incl. 1 Deputy Prime minister), 3 deputy ministers, 12 undersecretaries
 Northern League (LN): 3 ministers, 7 undersecretaries
 Union of Christian and Centre Democrats (UDC): 1 Deputy Prime minister, 3 ministers, 1 deputy minister, 6 undersecretaries
 Independents: 2 ministers, 1 undersecretary
 New Italian Socialist Party (NPSI): 1 deputy minister, 1 undersecretary
 Italian Republican Party (PRI): 1 deputy minister

Composition

Further reading

References

Italian Government - Berlusconi II Cabinet

Italian governments
Silvio Berlusconi
2001 establishments in Italy
2005 disestablishments in Italy
Cabinets established in 2001
Cabinets disestablished in 2005